Striatura is a genus of minute air-breathing land snails, terrestrial pulmonate gastropod mollusks or micromollusks in the family Gastrodontidae.

Species 
Species within the genus Striatura include:
 Striatura milium

References

 Nomenclator Zoologicus info

External links 
 SEM image of Striatura milium

Gastrodontidae